1648 Shajna, provisional designation , is a stony asteroid from the inner regions of the asteroid belt, approximately 9 kilometers in diameter. It was discovered on 5 September 1935, by Russian astronomer Pelageya Shajn at Simeiz Observatory on the Crimean peninsula. Two weeks later, it was independently discovered by Cyril Jackson at Johannesburg Observatory, South Africa. It was later named after the discoverer and her husband, Russian astronomers Grigory Shajn.

Orbit and classification 

Shajna orbits the Sun in the inner main-belt at a distance of 1.8–2.7 AU once every 3 years and 4 months (1,221 days). Its well-determined orbit has an eccentricity of 0.21 and an inclination of 5° with respect to the ecliptic.

Rotation period 

In July 2005, a rotational lightcurve of was obtained by French amateur astronomer Laurent Bernasconi. It gave a well-defined rotation period of 6.4140 hours with a brightness variation of 0.65 magnitude. Two modeled lightcurves from various surveys including the Lowell photometric database gave similar periods of 6.41368 and 6.41369 hours. Photometric observations at the Palomar Transient Factory in September 2012, gave nearly identical periods of 6.4140 and 6.4248 hours in the R- and S-band, respectively.

Diameter and albedo 

According to the surveys carried out by NASA's Wide-field Infrared Survey Explorer with its subsequent NEOWISE mission, Shajna measures between 8.26 and 9.45 kilometers in diameter, and its surface has an albedo between 0.191 and 0.35. The Collaborative Asteroid Lightcurve Link assumes a standard albedo for stony asteroids of 0.20 and calculates a diameter of 9.23 kilometers with an absolute magnitude of 12.54.

Naming 

This minor planet was named in honor of the late couple of Russian astronomers Grigory Shajn (1892–1956) and the discoverer herself, Pelageya Shajn (1894–1956), first woman ever to discover a minor planet. The asteroid 1190 Pelagia is also named after her, while her husband is honored by the lunar crater Shayn. The official  was published by the Minor Planet Center on 20 February 1962.

References

External links 
 Asteroid Lightcurve Database (LCDB), query form (info )
 Dictionary of Minor Planet Names, Google books
 Asteroids and comets rotation curves, CdR – Observatoire de Genève, Raoul Behrend
 Discovery Circumstances: Numbered Minor Planets (1)-(5000) – Minor Planet Center
 
 

001648
Discoveries by Pelageya Shajn
Named minor planets
001648
19350905